In Our Lifetime is the fourth album by American hip hop duo Eightball & MJG. The album was released on May 18, 1999, by Suave House Records under a new distribution deal with Universal Records. It was produced by their longtime producer T-Mix with additional production from Mr. DJ. It would be Eightball & MJG's last recording under Suave House Records. The album sold 95,000 copies in its first week.

Track listing

Personnel
Credits adapted from liner notes and AllMusic.

 Preston Crump - bass
 MJG - keyboards
 Mr. DJ - music programming, scratches, mixing
 Eric Gales - guitar
 Donny Mathis - guitar
 Marvin "Chanz" Parkman - keyboards
 T-Mix - producer, recording engineer
 John "Bernasky" Wall - recording engineer
 Crazy C - mixing
 Josh Butler - mixing
 Tony Dawsey - mastering

Charts

References

1999 albums
8Ball & MJG albums